Gungahlin Place is a transport interchange located in the Gungahlin Town Centre. It is the northern terminus of the Canberra Metro R1 Civic to Gungahlin line and is an important connection point between light rail and bus transport. The current bus interchange opened on 21 April 2018. Despite the station being named Gungahlin Place, the light rail platforms are actually located on a section of Hibberson Street that has been closed to road traffic. Light rail service began in April 2019.

As the northern terminus of Canberra Metro's R1 route, Gungahlin Place is the second busiest light rail station on the network, with 20% of all passengers boarding or alighting a service here in the first 10 months of operation.

Services

Light Rail
The light rail platforms are arranged to allow access to the vehicles from doors on both sides. This allows separation of passengers who are alighting and those waiting to board. During peak times both sets of platforms may be used and there is a crossover to allow arriving or departing light rail vehicles to switch between tracks. On the shoulder of peak hour, some services from Gungahlin Place terminate at Sandford Street when returning to the depot in Mitchell.

ACTION Bus Services

Gungahlin Place serves as the terminus for the R8 Rapid route between Belconnen and Gungahlin, as well as many local routes, most which operate as bi-directional loops, each connecting several suburbs within the district. There are currently 4 bus platforms in use.

References

Bus stations in Australia
Bus transport in Canberra
Transport buildings and structures in the Australian Capital Territory
Light rail stations in Canberra
Transport in Canberra
Railway stations in Australia opened in 2019